COMO Hotels and Resorts is a Singapore-based company that operates hotels in Australia, Bhutan, Indonesia, Italy, the Maldives, Thailand, Turks and Caicos, the United Kingdom and the United States. The company was founded by Christina Ong in 1991.

History 
The company was founded in 1991 by Christina Ong and her husband Ong Beng Seng. The company commenced operations with the opening of The Halkin hotel in London, England in 1991. This was followed by the opening of Parrot Cay resort in Turks and Caicos in 1998, and the Cocoa Island resort in the Maldives in 2002. In 2004, the company acquired and assumed management over the Begawan Giri Estate in Ubud, Bali.

Subsidiary company COMO Shambhala introduced a wellness app and website in June 2020.

The group's Parrot Cay resort was named the location of numerous celebrity death hoaxes, including hoaxes on the supposed deaths of Ted Nugent, Ja Rule, Chad Kroeger and Vince Vaughn.

In 2018, the company acquired Castello Del Nero, historic Tuscan castle-turned-hotel, in a deal worth €39.6 million. The property reopened in 2019 as COMO Castello Del Nero following extensive restorations led by Milanese designer Paola Navone.

Properties 

As of July 2021, COMO Hotels and Resorts operates 15 hotels in nine countries in Asia, Europe, North America, and Oceania. COMO Shambhala Estate in Ubud, Bali is the group's flagship.

Asia-Pacific

 COMO The Treasury, Perth, Australia
 COMO Uma Paro, Bhutan
 COMO Uma Punakha, Bhutan
 COMO Shambhala Estate, Bali, Indonesia
 COMO Uma Canggu, Bali, Indonesia
 COMO Uma Ubud, Bali, Indonesia
 COMO Cocoa Island, Maldives
 COMO Maalifushi, Maldives
 COMO Metropolitan Bangkok, Thailand
 COMO Point Yamu Phuket, Thailand

Europe

 COMO Castello del Nero, Italy
 COMO The Halkin London, United Kingdom
 COMO Metropolitan London, United Kingdom

North America

 COMO Parrot Cay, Turks and Caicos
 COMO Metropolitan Miami, United States

References 

Hotel chains in Singapore
Hotel and leisure companies based in Singapore
Singaporean brands
Hospitality companies of Singapore